Natuzzi Group is an Italian high end furniture company founded in 1959 by Pasquale Natuzzi, the group's Chairman, Chief Executive Officer and Group Stylist. It designs, produces and markets sofas, armchairs and living room accessories. Natuzzi is Italy's largest furniture house and company with the greatest global reach in its sector. In 1993, Natuzzi Group became the only foreign furniture company to list on Wall Street. It is headquartered in Santeramo in Colle, Apulia, Italy.

History
Pasquale Natuzzi was very young when he started his career. The son of a cabinet-maker, in 1959 at 19 years of age he opened a workshop in Taranto with three collaborators, producing sofas and armchairs for the local market. In 1962 he moved to Matera where he began to gain commercial experience. In 1967, still in Matera, Pasquale Natuzzi returned to the production of sofas and armchairs, this time on an industrial scale. In 1972 he founded Natuzzi Salotti S.r.l. One year later, following a fire that completely destroyed the Matera factory, Pasquale Natuzzi decided to relocate production to Santeramo in Colle (Bari – Italy), which is the modern-day headquarter of the Group.

Somewhere about the middle of the 1970s, Natuzzi took part for the first time in a furniture fair in Bari. Here started first contacts with customers from the Middle East: Saudi Arabia, Israel, Jordan. In 1976 Natuzzi exported 60% of the turnover in those countries, while 40% was realized in Italy.

The beginning of the 1980s was the turning point in Natuzzi Group's growth. During a trip to the United States, Pasquale Natuzzi spotted an opportunity to carry out a radical change of direction: "democratizing" the leather sofa, once a product for an elite niche. The first sofa sold at $999 in the United States was a Natuzzi, at Macy's.

Following the success in the United States, in 1985 Natuzzi Upholstery Inc. was established. Based in New York, the company was especially designed for the needs of its North American clients. In 1998, further confirmation of the Group's strong ties with the American market was given by the inauguration in High Point, North Carolina, of a futuristic-looking building, designed by the architect Mario Bellini, housing the offices of Natuzzi Americas, with a showroom measuring 8,000 square metres.

With North American expansion continuing, the Group then went on to strengthen its presence in Italy and throughout Europe. The 1990s saw the opening in Taranto, on Pasquale Natuzzi's initiative, of the first shop in the franchising chain Divani & Divani by Natuzzi. There are Natuzzi stores and Natuzzi Galleries outside Italy, including: Greece, Cyprus, Spain, Portugal, France, Switzerland, China, Hong Kong, Taiwan, Singapore, Saudi Arabia, United Arab Emirates, Qatar, Turkey, Israel, Netherlands, Croatia, Bosnia and Herzegovina, Poland, Hungary, Russia, Mexico, Thailand, India, Vietnam, United Kingdom, South Korea, Australia, Brazil and United States.

Today Pasquale Natuzzi personally oversees strategic activities relating to strengthening the brand with investments in product innovation and research, marketing, communication and staff training, working alongside the Group's managers to define future strategies.

Natuzzi products
The Group's product offering is divided into three brands.

Natuzzi Italia is the "made in Italy" brand dedicated to the high-end market. The sofas and armchairs of the Natuzzi Italia collection are complemented by a selection of home furnishings, lamps, accessories, and living room furniture. Natuzzi Italia products are distributed through single-brand point of sales: Natuzzi Store and Natuzzi Gallery (shop-in-the-shop).

Natuzzi Editions is the brand that provides a wide range upholstery and furnishings, available in different designs and functions, made in Natuzzi's factory all over the world.

Private Label (Softaly) is a sales program dedicated to key accounts.

See also 

List of companies of Italy

Bibliography
Agnese Sinisi, Natuzzi Un divano a Wall Street – Milano, Egea, 2008
Federico Pirro, Angelo Guarini, Grande Industria e Mezzogiorno 1996-2007 – Bari, Cacucci Editore, 2008 
Federico Rampini, L’impero di Cindia – Milano, Mondadori, 2007 
Gianfranco Viesti,  Il Sud che attrae - Donzelli Editore, 2002
Franco Tatò,  Perché la Puglia non è la California - BC Dalai Editore, 2002
Mauro Castelli, Questa Italia siamo noi – Milano - Il Sole 24 Ore, 2000 
Roberto Napoletano,  Fatti per vincere -  Sperling&Kupfer, 1999

References 

Furniture companies of Italy
Industrial design firms
Design companies of Italy
Companies based in Apulia
Design companies established in 1959
Manufacturing companies established in 1959
Italian companies established in 1959
Companies listed on the New York Stock Exchange
Italian brands